The community contribution company is a type of corporate structure set up in 2012 in British Columbia, Canada. It is intermediate between a commercial, for-profit, model, and the charitable, non-profit organisation.  Traditionally, non-profit organizations either depend a combination of government funding, philanthropy, and earned income. This corporate model was set up to help build earned income to secure long-term growth.

See also 
Benefit corporation, a similar type of legal organization in the United States
Community interest company, a similar type of legal organization in the United Kingdom
Social entrepreneurship, a practice which involves hybrid for-profit/nonprofit organizational strategies which community contribution companies are designed to accommodate.
L3C, a similar type of legal organization in the United States

References 

Social entrepreneurship
Social economy in Canada